Monroe Township is one of thirteen townships in Putnam County, Indiana. As of the 2010 census, its population was 1,569 and it contained 672 housing units.

History
The Brick Chapel United Methodist Church and James Edington Montgomery O'Hair House are listed on the National Register of Historic Places.

Geography

Cities and towns
 Bainbridge

Unincorporated towns
 Brick Chapel at 
 Cary at 
(This list is based on USGS data and may include former settlements.)

References

External links
 Indiana Township Association
 United Township Association of Indiana

Townships in Putnam County, Indiana
Townships in Indiana